Eldrevatnet or Eldrevatn is a lake in the municipality of Lærdal in Vestland county, Norway.

The lake Eldrevatnet is regulated by a hydroelectric dam and supplies water for a nearby power station.

See also
List of lakes in Norway

References

Lakes of Vestland
Lærdal
Reservoirs in Norway